The Indianapolis Checkers were a minor league professional ice hockey team from Indianapolis, Indiana. The Checkers' home arena was the Fairgrounds Coliseum from 1981 to 1985 and Market Square Arena from 1979 to 1981 and again from 1985 to 1987. The team originated in the Central Hockey League where they played from 1979 to 1984. The Checkers filled a void left by the departed Indianapolis Racers of the World Hockey Association. Indianapolis won the Adams Cup as the CHL champions twice, in 1982 and 1983.

The team transferred to the International Hockey League, where they played from 1984 to 1987. At the completion of the 1986–87 season, the team was relocated to Denver, Colorado, and renamed the Denver Rangers.

Season-by-season results

References
Hockeydb.com Indianapolis Checkers Statistics 1979–84
Hockeydb.com Indianapolis Checkers Statistics 1984–87

International Hockey League (1945–2001) teams
Defunct ice hockey teams in the United States
Ice hockey clubs established in 1979
Ice hockey clubs disestablished in 1987
Central Professional Hockey League teams
Boston Bruins minor league affiliates
Ice hockey teams in Indiana
Minnesota North Stars minor league affiliates
New York Rangers minor league affiliates
New Jersey Devils minor league affiliates
New York Islanders minor league affiliates
1979 establishments in Indiana
1987 disestablishments in Indiana